Avricourt is a commune in the Moselle department in Grand Est in northeastern France.

Avricourt, Moselle is adjacent to Avricourt, Meurthe-et-Moselle with which it formed a single entity until a revision of the Treaty of Frankfurt in 1871.

Population

See also 
 Avricourt, Meurthe-et-Moselle
 Communes of the Moselle department
 Parc naturel régional de Lorraine

References

External links
 

Communes of Moselle (department)